Dagmar Winter (born 1965) is a bishop in the Church of England. Since 2019, she has served as Bishop of Huntingdon, a suffragan bishop in the Diocese of Ely. She was previously priest in charge of a large, rural parish in Northumbria (2006–2015), and Rector of Hexham Abbey (2015–2019).

Early life and education
Winter was born in 1963 and is of British and Swiss-German descent. She studied at the University of Aberdeen in Scotland, and the University of Erlangen–Nuremberg and Heidelberg University in Germany. She trained for ordination at Herborn Theological Seminary from 1993 to 1996, during which she also completed a Doctor of Theology (DrTheol) degree.

Ordained ministry
Winter was made a deacon at Petertide 1996 (29 June), and ordained a priest the Petertide following year (28 June 1997) — both times by Michael Nazir-Ali, Bishop of Rochester, at Rochester Cathedral. She served her curacy at St Mark's Church, Bromley in the Diocese of Rochester. From 1999 to 2006, she was deanery training officer and associate vicar of Hexham Abbey in the Diocese of Newcastle.

From 2006 to 2015, she was priest in charge of Kirkwhelpington, Kirkharle, Kirkheaton and Cambo; a group of rural parishes in Northumberland. During this time she held a number of additional appointments: Diocesan Officer for Rural Affairs in the Diocese of Newcastle (2006–2015), Area Dean of Morpeth (2011-2013), and adviser for women's ministry to the Bishop of Newcastle (2012-2019). She was made an honorary canon of Newcastle Cathedral in 2011. In 2015, she returned to Hexham Abbey having been appointed Rector of Hexham.

Since 2005, Winter has been an elected member of the General Synod of the Church of England. She has served on the Rural Group, the Mission and Public Affairs Committee of the Church of England, and the Meissen Committee (Evangelical Church in Germany–Church of England relations).

Episcopal ministry
In May 2019, it was announced that Winter would be the next Bishop of Huntingdon, a suffragan bishop in the Diocese of Ely. She was consecrated as a bishop at St Paul's Cathedral on 3 July 2019 by Justin Welby, Archbishop of Canterbury.

References

1965 births
Alumni of the University of Aberdeen
Bishops of Huntingdon
Women Anglican bishops
Living people
21st-century Church of England bishops
University of Erlangen-Nuremberg alumni
Heidelberg University alumni
Members of the General Synod of the Church of England